Igor Valeryevich Andreev (BGN/PCGN: Andreyev, ISO 9: Andreev, ; born 14 July 1983) is a Russian former professional tennis player. He won three ATP Tour singles titles, reached the quarterfinals of the 2007 French Open and achieved a career-high singles ranking of world No. 18 in November 2008.

Tennis career

2003
Andreev made his ATP debut in September 2003 in Bucharest, Romania as a qualifier and defeated top seed Nikolay Davydenko 7–5, 6–7, 6–0 in the first round, before losing in the next round to José Acasuso.

At the Moscow ATP tournament later the same month, Andreev defeated the top seed Sjeng Schalken in straight sets, 6–3, 6–1, and made his first ATP quarterfinal appearance, eventually losing to Paul-Henri Mathieu 6–2, 3–6, 5–7. He entered the St. Petersburg tournament in October 2003 as a wildcard, and defeated fourth seed Max Mirnyi 6–4, 7–6 before losing to Sargis Sargsian in the second round.

2004
Andreev finished in the top 50 of the ATP rankings for the first time in his career. During the same year, he also reached two ATP finals: Gstaad, Switzerland in July (losing to Roger Federer), and Bucharest, Romania in September (losing to José Acasuso). He won a personal best 28 matches in the year, and made his Davis Cup debut.

Andreev made his Grand Slam debut at the 2004 Australian Open, where he lost in the first round to France's Olivier Patience, 4–6, 4–6, 7–6(4), 6–1, 6–2. At the French Open, he knocked out defending champion Juan Carlos Ferrero in the second round before losing to eventual champion Gastón Gaudio 6–4, 7–5, 6–3 in the fourth round.

He won his first ATP doubles title in Moscow in October 2004 with Nikolay Davydenko, defeating Mahesh Bhupathi and Jonas Björkman 3–6, 6–3, 6–4 in the final.

2005: Three ATP titles
Andreev's first ATP singles title came in April 2005 in Valencia, Spain, beating Spaniard David Ferrer 6–3, 5–7, 6–3 in the final after having taken out Rafael Nadal in the quarterfinals. Andreev made the third round at both the French Open and Wimbledon, and reached the quarterfinal at the Pilot Pen Tennis Tournament in New Haven, Connecticut. He then reached the final of the event at Bucharest, losing to Florent Serra 6–3, 6–4.

Andreev continued his consistent performance of the year by winning the Palermo event in September 2005, beating Filippo Volandri of Italy 0–6, 6–1, 6–3 in the final, and the Kremlin Cup at Moscow in October, defeating Nicolas Kiefer 5–7, 7–6, 6–2 in the final.

2006
In the first half of the season, Andreev experienced seven first-round losses, and highlights included reaching the finals at Sydney and the quarterfinals at Indian Wells, losing both matches to James Blake. A knee injury forced Andreev to miss the second half of the clay court season, including Roland Garross.

2007: First Grand Slam quarterfinal

Andreev returned in 2007, and made an immediate impact with an impressive showing at the French Open. Unseeded, he beat former world no. 1 Andy Roddick 3–6, 6–4, 6–3, 6–4 in the first round, then Nicolás Massú, Paul-Henri Mathieu and Marcos Baghdatis in the fourth round to make his first Grand Slam quarterfinal, which he lost in straight sets to Novak Djokovic 6–3, 6–3, 6–3.

2008: Best ranking, world no. 18
Notable performances included reaching the quarterfinals of Buenos Aires, Dubai, Miami, and Monte Carlo.

2009
Heavily favored Russia was hosted by Israel in a Davis Cup quarterfinal tie in July 2009 on indoor hard courts at the Nokia Arena in Tel Aviv. Asked if he was nervous, Andreev replied with a smile: "Nervous? Why should I be nervous?  Everything is fine." Harel Levy, world no. 210, then beat Andreev 6–4, 6–2, 4–6, 6–2 in the opening match. Dudi Sela (world no. 33) followed by beating Youzhny, and the next day Israelis Andy Ram and Jonathan Erlich beat Safin and doubles specialist Kunitsyn. With the tie clinched for Israel, best-of-three sets were played, with the outcomes of little to no importance. Dudi Sela hurt his wrist in the first set. Israel won 4–1.

2010: Injuries and ranking downfall
After the Australian Open, Andreev played the 2010 Brasil Open, his first clay court tournament of the year. Seeded no. 4 in the tournament, Andreev made a run to the semifinals and eventually lost to Łukasz Kubot 6–2, 2–6, 4–6.

His next successful tournament was the Malaysia Open where he reached the semifinals, taking out defending champion Nikolay Davydenko on the way before falling to Mikhail Youzhny in three sets.

2011–2013: Injuries and retirement
A knee injury thwarted Andreev in 2011, and in 2012 a shoulder injury prevented him from achieving decent results in almost every tournament. He lost ranking points and struggled to win a match in the qualifying round of small tournaments. The situation became worse in 2013. After not having played since the Monte-Carlo Rolex Masters in April, he lost in every first round match of the qualifying draw of every tournament he tried to play until the French Open 2013. At Wimbledon 2013 Andreev appeared in the main draw as a protected ranking player and in the first round he faced Polish Łukasz Kubot losing 6–1, 7–5, 6–2. Andreev announced his final retirement from tennis due to the multiple injuries that ruined his career after 2010 and 2011.

Playing style & equipment
Andreev is an offensive baseliner. He possessed one of the more powerful forehands on tour. ATP professional Marcos Baghdatis describes Andreev's forehand as being "more deadly than Nadal's" Andreev is sponsored by Sergio Tacchini for clothes and Babolat Aero Pro Drive GT for racquets and Babolat All-Court III for shoes.

Personal life
He supports both FC Moscow and FC Dynamo Moscow and is an avid follower of the Russian national football team.

He was in a relationship with fellow Russian player Maria Kirilenko for several years, before they split in 2011.

ATP career finals

Singles: 9 (3–6)

Doubles: 2 (1–1)

Performance timelines

Singles
Current till 2013 Wimbledon Championships.

Doubles

Top 10 wins

References

External links
 
 
 
 
 
 
 Andreev World Ranking History

1983 births
Hopman Cup competitors
Living people
Olympic tennis players of Russia
Russian male tennis players
Tennis players from Moscow
Tennis players at the 2004 Summer Olympics
Tennis players at the 2008 Summer Olympics